Dmitry Sinitsyn (born June 17, 1994) is a Russian professional ice hockey player. He is currently an unrestricted free agent who has  played in the Kontinental Hockey League (KHL). Sinitsyn was selected by the Dallas Stars in the seventh round (183rd overall) of the 2012 NHL Entry Draft.

Playing career
Sinitsyn has formerly played collegiate hockey in North America, with the University of Massachusetts-Lowell and major junior hockey with the Regina Pats of the Western Hockey League (WHL).

Un-signed from the Dallas Stars, Sinitsyn returned to Russia to make his professional debut with HC Dynamo Moscow of the KHL, while also playing a season with HC Lada Togliatti.

In the 2017–18 season, Sinitsyn agreed to a contract with Spartak Moscow, before missing the entirety of the year due to injury.

On May 3, 2018, he originally agreed to a VHL contract with newly demoted Metallurg Novokuznetsk for the 2018–19 season, however did not feature with the club.

Career statistics

References

External links

1994 births
Living people
Dallas Stars draft picks
Dizel Penza players
Dynamo Balashikha players
Expatriate ice hockey players in Canada
HC Dynamo Moscow players
HC Lada Togliatti players
Ice hockey people from Moscow
Regina Pats players
Russian expatriate sportspeople in Canada
Russian ice hockey defencemen
UMass Lowell River Hawks men's ice hockey players